"I've Got a Crush on You" is a song composed by George Gershwin, with lyrics by Ira Gershwin. It is unique among Gershwin compositions in that it was used for two different Broadway productions: Treasure Girl (1928), when it was introduced by Clifton Webb and Mary Hay, and Strike Up the Band (1930), when it was sung by Doris Carson and Gordon Smith. It was later included in the tribute musical Nice Work If You Can Get It (2012), in which it was sung by Jennifer Laura Thompson. When covered by Frank Sinatra he was a part of Columbia records.

It is considered a jazz standard, primarily of the vocal repertoire, thanks to recordings by singers such as Frank Sinatra, Sarah Vaughan and Ella Fitzgerald. Instrumental versions have also been recorded by Nat Adderley, Ike Quebec and others.

Notable recordings

Lee Wiley, recorded on November 15, 1939 for Liberty Music Shop Records. She recorded it again in 1950 and it was included in her album Night in Manhattan. 
Joe Sullivan's Cafe Society Orchestra (vocal: Helen Ward). This charted briefly in October 1940 in the No. 24 spot.
Sarah Vaughan, recorded on July 18, 1946 for Musicraft Records (catalog No. 505). She recorded the song again in 1957 for the album Sarah Vaughan Sings George Gershwin and in 1982 with Michael Tilson Thomas for Gershwin Live!.
Frank Sinatra, recorded on November 5, 1947 for Columbia Records. This charted briefly in 1948. He recorded the song again in 1960 and it was included in his album Nice 'n' Easy.
Ella Fitzgerald - Ella Sings Gershwin (1950), Ella Fitzgerald Sings the George and Ira Gershwin Songbook (1959), and Nice Work If You Can Get It, a 1983 Pablo release with André Previn
Gene Kelly - an outtake from the film An American in Paris (1951).
Bing Crosby recorded the song in 1956 for use on his radio show and it was subsequently included in the box set The Bing Crosby CBS Radio Recordings (1954-56) issued by Mosaic Records (catalog MD7-245) in 2009. 
Dinah Washington - In the Land of Hi-Fi (1956)
Nat Adderley - Work Song (1960)
Anna Maria Alberghetti - for her album I Can't Resist You (1957).
Sammy Davis Jr. - for his album Mood to Be Wooed (1958).
Julie London - included in her album Nice Girls Don't Stay for Breakfast (1967).
Rosemary Clooney - Everything's Coming Up Rosie (1977) and for the album Gershwin 100 (1998).
Cleo Laine - for her album That Old Feeling (1987).
Linda Ronstadt, on the album What's New (US AC #7, Canada AC #1, 1983). Ronstadt previously performed the song on "The Muppet Show".
Carol Sloane on But Not For Me (1986)
Frank Sinatra and Barbra Streisand from Duets (Frank Sinatra album) (1993)
Carly Simon, on the album The Glory of Gershwin (1994)
Keely Smith - for her album Keely Sings Sinatra (2001).
Rod Stewart and Diana Ross (duet) - from Stewart's album Thanks for the Memory: The Great American Songbook, Volume IV (2005).
Steve Tyrell - included in his album This Guy's in Love (2003).
Chris Connor - for her album Chris Connor Sings the George Gershwin Almanac of Song (1957).
June Christy - A Friendly Session, Vol. 1 (1998) with the Johnny Guarnieri Quintet.
Stacey Kent - Dreamsville (2000).
Michael Bublé, on the EP With Love (2006)
Brian Wilson - Brian Wilson Reimagines Gershwin (2010)
Luscious Jackson- Red Hot + Rhapsody (1998)
Michael Feinstein - included in his album The Sinatra Project (2008).
Darius de Haas and Steven Blier - Quiet Please (2010)
Jennifer Aniston sang this song during the Ellen Degeneres Show.
Uri Caine, on album Rhapsody in Blue (2013).
Kristin Chenoweth sings the song on her 2016 album The Art of Elegance.
  Emma Hedrick at Urban Vines in 2019

Film appearances 
 1951 Meet Danny Wilson - sung by Frank Sinatra.
 1951 An American in Paris - played as background music. It had been recorded for the film by Gene Kelly but it was omitted from the released print.
 1955 Three for the Show - performed by Betty Grable and Jack Lemmon.
 1957 The Helen Morgan Story
 1974 Alice Doesn't Live Here Anymore - performed by Ellen Burstyn.
 1977 The Choirboys - sung by Vic Tayback.
 1979 Featured in Woody Allen's Manhattan which was scored exclusively with Gershwin music. Performed by The New York Philharmonic.
1984 Bulaklak sa City Jail - sung by Nora Aunor
 2003 Mona Lisa Smile - performed by Seal.
 2003 Something's Gotta Give - sung by Steve Tyrell.
 2008 Definitely, Maybe -  the song was performed by actress Rachel Weisz as her character's favorite song

References

1928 songs
1920s jazz standards
1940 singles
1948 singles
1983 singles
Songs from musicals
Songs with music by George Gershwin
Songs with lyrics by Ira Gershwin
Recordings of music by George Gershwin
Linda Ronstadt songs
Asylum Records singles
Pop standards